Anthony Frank Hinds (19 September 1922 – 30 September 2013), also known as Tony Hinds and John Elder, was an English screenwriter and producer.

Early life
The son of the founder of Hammer Film Productions, William Hinds, Anthony Hinds was born in Uxbridge, Middlesex and educated at St Paul's School. He briefly joined his father's business before his war service as a pilot in the RAF during World War II.

Career
In 1946 Hinds returned to Hammer and initially produced a great many modest thrillers. One of these was The Dark Road (1947), one of the quota quickies, which featured a jewellery shop called 'Hinds', a reference to his father's original business. This business had been divided in the 1920s between William and his brother Frank Hinds. Frank's part is now the F. Hinds national jewellery chain.

In the summer of 1953 Hinds was enthralled by the BBC's The Quatermass Experiment, a six-part science fiction thriller written by Nigel Kneale. Hinds was so impressed by what he saw that he suggested Hammer buy the big screen rights. They approached the BBC and snapped up the rights. After requesting the new 'X' certificate from the British Board of Film Censors, The Quatermass Xperiment (1955) was a box-office success and was the first of the three Quatermass cinema films based on the television serials.

Hinds came up with the idea of hiring country houses and shooting films in the rooms and grounds of the locations, which saved the cost of kitting out a full studio. The company acquired Down Place, renaming it Bray Studios, and was based there until 1966. Under the pseudonym John Elder he was a prolific screenwriter and from the mid-1960s he concentrated on this activity, though he produced the TV series Journey to the Unknown for LWT (1968–69) and The Lost Continent (1968).

The horror script The Unquenchable Thirst of Dracula, which he wrote in the 1970s for Hammer, was never filmed. In October 2015 it was presented as a live stage reading by the Mayhem Film Festival at the Broadway Cinema in Nottingham, featuring the actor and film historian Jonathan Rigby as narrator. In October 2017 a studio production of the script was broadcast on BBC Radio 4, with narration by Michael Sheen.

Selected filmography
 Meet Simon Cherry (1949)
 Celia (1949)
 The Adventures of PC 49 (1949)
 Room to Let (1950)
 A Case for PC 49 (1951)
 The Dark Light (1951)
 To Have and to Hold (1951)
 Wings of Danger (1952)
 Death of an Angel (1952)

References

External links

1922 births
2013 deaths
English film producers
English male screenwriters
Hammer Film Productions
People educated at St Paul's School, London
Royal Air Force personnel of World War II
20th-century English businesspeople